Mordellistena ivoirensis is a beetle in the genus Mordellistena of the family Mordellidae. It was described in 1942 by Maurice Pic.

References

ivoirensis
Beetles described in 1942